The French Basketball Cup MVP (or the Coupe de France Final MVP)  is an annual award that is given to the best player in the Final of a given French Basketball Cup tournament. The winner of the award is announced after the final game. 

No player has won the MVP award more than once. Théo Maledon is the youngest player ever to win the award at age 17, when he did with ASVEL in 2019.

Winners

Awards won by nationality

Awards won by club

References

MVP